Billy Dervan is a New Zealand rugby league player who represented New Zealand.

Playing career
From Auckland, Dervan was selected on the 1912 New Zealand tour of Australia. No test matches were played on this tour. He had originally played rugby for the City club before switching to rugby league and joining the Newton Rangers in the 1912 season. He retired at the end of the season and was on the Newton committee in 1913.

Boxing
Dervan was heavily involved in boxing in Auckland and was the official announcer for events for over 20 years.

Death
Dervan died suddenly at the age of 60 on April 18, 1944. He had been attending the boxing at the Town Hall the night before (on his 60th birthday) as a spectator when he began feeling unwell. Dervan was survived by his wife Ivy May Derwan (nee Hodgson), daughter, and son.

References

New Zealand rugby league players
New Zealand national rugby league team players
Auckland rugby league team players
Newton Rangers players
Rugby league locks
Place of birth missing
1884 births
1944 deaths